Richard 'Richie' Eyres (born 7 December 1964) is an English-born former professional rugby league and rugby union footballer who played in the 1980s and 1990s.

Background
Richie Eyres was born in St Helens, Lancashire, England, he has Welsh ancestors, and eligible to play for Wales  due to the grandparent rule.

Playing career

International honours
Richie Eyres won a cap for England while at Widnes in 1992 against Wales, won caps for Wales while at Leeds in 1995 against England, France, and in the 1995 Rugby League World Cup, against France, Western Samoa, and England, and while at Swinton in 1998 against England, and in 1999 against Ireland, and Scotland, and won caps for Great Britain while at Widnes in 1989 against France (interchange/substitute), in 1991 against France (twice, once as a substitute), in 1992 in the 1989–1992 Rugby League World Cup against France (interchange/substitute), and Australia (interchange/substitute), in 1993 against France (2 matches), and while at Leeds in 1993 against New Zealand (interchange/substitute) (2 matches).

Eyres is unusual in having initially represented England and then gone onto represent Wales.

Eyres played and scored a try in Widnes' 30–18 victory over Canberra Raiders in the 1989 World Club Challenge at Old Trafford, Manchester on Wednesday 4 October 1989.

Family

References

External links
Neath to complete the signing of Richie Eyres
Statistics at rugby.widnes.tv
PastPlayers – E at neathrugby.co.uk
Statistics at neathrugby.co.uk
Search for "Eyres" at espnscrum.com
Statistics at wolvesplayers.thisiswarrington.co.uk

1966 births
Living people
Coventry R.F.C. players
England national rugby league team players
English rugby league players
English rugby union players
Footballers who switched code
Great Britain national rugby league team players
Leeds Rhinos players
Neath RFC players
Rochdale Hornets players
Rugby league locks
Rugby league players from St Helens, Merseyside
Rugby league second-rows
Rugby union players from St Helens, Merseyside
Sheffield Eagles (1984) players
Swinton Lions players
Wales national rugby league team players
Warrington Wolves players
Widnes Vikings players